John Collins (June 8, 1717<ref>The Biographical Directory of the United States Congress states June 8, while the Dictionary of American Biography states November 1.</ref>March 4, 1795), was an American politician and a Founding Father of the United States who, as a member of the Continental Congress, signed the Articles of Confederation. He was the third governor of the U.S. state of Rhode Island from 1786 to 1790. 

Early life
Born in Newport in the Colony of Rhode Island and Providence Plantations, he was the son of Samuel and Elizabeth Collins.

 Political life 
He stood forth as a staunch advocate of the independence of the Thirteen Colonies. An admirer of George Washington, he was selected by the governor of Rhode Island in 1776 to carry a letter to Washington informing him of the condition of the colony and soliciting counsel upon the best method to adopt for its defense. In 1778, Collins represented Rhode Island in the Second Continental Congress, where he served until May 1781, when he was superseded by William Ellery. He was, however, re-elected in 1782 and held the position until 1783.

In 1782, he was made bearer to the President of Congress of a statement of Rhode Island's reasons for rejecting the Impost Act. During the American Revolution, Rhode Island was for the most part an agricultural area, and as such opposed the restrictions of a national government. The state's agricultural interests vigorously advocated a paper currency. Collins espoused their cause and in 1786 was elected governor. During his term in office, the issuance of paper money, which had been ceased at intervals since 1750, was resumed. It was provided by law that should any creditor refuse to accept the bills of the state the debtor might secure a discharge by depositing the amount of his debt with one of the judges of the state superior court or the court of common pleas. This law led to the suit of Trevett vs. Weeden, which resulted in a decision looking toward the right of courts to declare legislative enactments unconstitutional.

Rhode Island's ratification of the U.S. Constitution

When Washington was inaugurated as President of the United States on April 30, 1789, Rhode Island was one of only two of the thirteen original states (along with North Carolina) not to have ratified the United States Constitution and was, technically speaking, an independent nation with Collins as it chief of state. Anti-Federalist elements in Rhode Island vigorously fought against the calling of a convention to decide upon entering the Federal Union, but on January 17, 1790, gave its sanction to such a call by a majority of one vote in the General Assembly. This vote was cast by Collins, who had come to realize the importance of a Federal connection. The vote cost him his popularity and the governorship. He left office on May 5, 1790.  The Rhode Island General Assembly ratified the United States Constitution on May 29. Later in 1790, Collins was elected to the 1st Congress but did not take his seat.

Personal life

Collins was married to Mary, daughter of John Avery of Boston, and his daughter Abigail married John Warren. Collins died at Newport and was buried on his farm, "Brenton Neck", near Brenton Point in that city. His grandson and namesake, John Collins Covell (1823–1887), was a principal of the Virginia School for the Deaf and the Blind and West Virginia Schools for the Deaf and Blind. The Rhode Island Society of the Sons of the Revolution holds an annual observance of Rhode Island Independence Day (May 4) at Governor Collins' grave.

Notes

References
 "John Collins". Dictionary of American Biography''. American Council of Learned Societies, 1928–1936.
 

1717 births
1795 deaths
Continental Congressmen from Rhode Island
18th-century American politicians
Signers of the Articles of Confederation
Governors of Rhode Island
Founding Fathers of the United States